Lucas Coutinho Tavares (born July 10, 1992) is a Brazilian football player. He plays for Resende.

Career
Lucas Tavares joined J3 League club SC Sagamihara in 2016.

References

External links

1992 births
Living people
Brazilian footballers
J3 League players
SC Sagamihara players
Brazilian expatriate footballers
Expatriate footballers in Japan
Association football defenders